Mateusz Przybylko (born March 9, 1992) is a German high jumper of Polish descent. He won the gold medal at the 2018 European Championships.

Career
A member of Germany's track and field squad at the 2015 IAAF World Championships and the 2016 Summer Olympics, Przybylko cleared a personal best of 2.35 m. Przybylko currently trains for the track and field squad at TSV Bayer 04 Leverkusen under the tutelage of his coach Hans-Jörg Thomaskamp.

At the 2016 Summer Olympics in Rio de Janeiro, Przybylko competed for Germany, along with his fellow countryman Eike Onnen, in the men's high jump. Leading up to his maiden Games, Przybylko jumped a height of 2.30 metres to surpass the IAAF Olympic entry standard (2.29) by a single centimetre at the 2015 Kurpfalz Gala in Weinheim. During the qualifying phase, Przybylko elected to pass 2.17 at his second attempt and remained clean at 2.22, before he could not reach the 2.26-metre barrier with all three misses, ending his Olympic campaign in twenty-eighth place.

Przybylko also came from a sporting family of Polish origin. Mateusz's father Mariusz previously played for one of his native country's regional football clubs, while his mother Violetta ran for the Polish track and field team in her youth. Mateusz's younger brothers and twins Kacper and Jakub inherited their father's sporting talent to compete internationally for Poland in football.

Competition record

References

External links

Living people
1992 births
Sportspeople from Bielefeld
German male high jumpers
Olympic male high jumpers
Olympic athletes of Germany
Athletes (track and field) at the 2016 Summer Olympics
Athletes (track and field) at the 2020 Summer Olympics
World Athletics Championships athletes for Germany
European Athletics Championships winners
German national athletics champions
German people of Polish descent